Wild About Harry, also known as American Primitive, is a 2009 American family drama film directed by Gwen Wynne and starring Tate Donovan, Adam Pascal, Danielle Savre, Skye McCole Bartusiak, Josh Peck, Corey Sevier, Susan Anspach, Fernando Colunga, James Sikking, Daniela Castro and Stacey Dash. It was written by Gwen Wynne and Mary Beth Fielder.  The film had the original title American Primitive and a script titled Once in a Very Blue Moon.

Premise
Teenaged sisters Madeline and Daisy, living on Cape Cod, deal with the implications of their widower father Harry coming out in 1973.

Cast

 Tate Donovan as Harry Goodhart
 Adam Pascal as Theodore Gibbs
 Danielle Savre as Madeline Goodhart
 Skye McCole Bartusiak as Daisy Goodhart
 Josh Peck as Spoke White
 Corey Sevier as Sam Brown
 Susan Anspach as Martha
 Fernando Colunga as Danny Walker
 Cesar Evora as Ricardo 
 Francisco Gattorno as Jose 
 Daniela Castro as Debbie 
 James Sikking as William Cauldicott
 Anne Ramsay as Katrina Brown
 Stacy Dash as Joy Crowley
 Johanna Braddy as Lucy Carmichael
 Jordan-Claire Green as Bridget
 Blythe Auffarth as Eliza
 Suzan Crowley as Gertie
 John Savage as Horace White
 Paul Sass as Mr. Brown
 Kristina Klebe as Eliza Cauldicott
 Jason Stuart as Randolph
 Helen Carey as Mrs. Yates
 Suzan Crowley as Gertie
 John Franchi as Dancer
 Geno Monteiro as Michael
 Lili Barsha as Tiger Lady
 Veronica Blake as Heidi Lotito
 Victor Warren as Marcus Brown

Production

Reception
Tom Gregory of The Huffington Post wrote, "American Primitive is the “why” that drove early activists like Harvey Milk and the Stonewall demonstrators to demand equality. It’s a film about the struggle to redefine a peaceful, safe home against hatred, misunderstanding, and family law at the time when homosexuality was classified as mental illness. Set in 1973, this indie gem personalizes the mistrust, alienation, and prejudice that same-sex families still fight against today." 
Like Tom Gregory, Quiet Earth wrote "the acting was top notch", and praised the performance of Josh Peck. They wrote the film had fantastic "beginning feeling and production style", and spoke well of the film's theme and storyline. 'Seattle Gay News praised the film, writing "I love that this Queer love story is told through the eyes of Madeline. It's an unusual way into a Queer story and one that provides interesting insights from a fresh perspective. American Primitive is a nicely turned out little film that I highly recommend".

References

External links
  as archived August 18, 2012
 

2009 films
2009 drama films
American drama films
2000s English-language films
2000s American films